Derek Burnett (born 27 October 1970) is an Irish sport shooter from County Longford, who specialises in the trap.

At the 2004 Olympic Games he finished in joint ninth place in the trap qualification, missing a place among the top six, who progressed to the final round. He also competed at the 2000, 2008, 2012 and 2020 Olympic Games as well as the 2015 and 2019 European Games.

References

External links
 
 
 
 

1970 births
Living people
Irish male sport shooters
Trap and double trap shooters
Olympic shooters of Ireland
Shooters at the 2000 Summer Olympics
Shooters at the 2004 Summer Olympics
Shooters at the 2008 Summer Olympics
Shooters at the 2012 Summer Olympics
Shooters at the 2020 Summer Olympics
European Games competitors for Ireland
Shooters at the 2015 European Games
Shooters at the 2019 European Games
Sportspeople from County Longford